Port Huon is a rural locality in the local government area (LGA) of Huon Valley in the South-east LGA region of Tasmania. The 2016 census recorded a population of 428 for the state suburb of Port Huon.

History 
Port Huon was gazetted as a locality in 1965.

Geography
The waters of the Huon River estuary form the eastern boundary.

Road infrastructure 
Route A6 (Huon Highway) runs through from north-east to south-west.

References

Towns in Tasmania
Localities of Huon Valley Council